The Samuel Davidson Professorship of Old Testament Studies is a chair in Old Testament studies at King's College, London (formerly of the University of London). It was established in 1925 and is named after the Irish Biblical scholar Samuel Davidson.

List of Samuel Davidson Professors

 1926 to 1929: George Herbert Box; first incumbent 
 1930 to 1945: S. H. Hooke
 1945 to 1947: Alfred Guillaume
 1948 to 1960: W. D. McHardy
 1961 to 1982: Peter Ackroyd
 1983 to 1992: Ronald Clements; first incumbent to be based at King's College London
 1992 to 1997: vacant
 1997 to 2001: Michael A. Knibb
 2001 to 2012: vacant
 2012 to present: Paul Joyce

References

Old Testament Studies, Davidson, Samuel
Old Testament Studies, Davidson, Samuel
1925 establishments in England